KKSE may refer to:

 KKSE (AM), a radio station (950 AM) licensed to serve Parker, Colorado, United States
 KKSE-FM, a radio station (92.5 FM) licensed to serve Broomfield, Colorado